{{Taxobox
| name = Anaerostipes butyraticus
| domain = Bacteria
| phylum = Bacillota
| classis = Clostridia
| ordo = Eubacteriales
| familia = Lachnospiraceae
| genus = Anaerostipes
| species = A. butyraticus
| binomial = Anaerostipes butyraticus| binomial_authority = Eeckhaut et al. 2010
| type_strain = 35-7, DSM 22094, Eeckhaut 35-7, JCM 17466, KCTC 15125, LMG 24724
| subdivision = 
| synonyms = 
}}Anaerostipes butyraticus'''''  is a Gram-positive, butyrate-producing and anaerobic bacterium from the genus of Anaerostipes which has been isolated from the caecal content of a broiler chicken in Ghent in Belgium.

References

External links
Type strain of Anaerostipes butyraticus at BacDive -  the Bacterial Diversity Metadatabase	

Lachnospiraceae
Bacteria described in 2010